Arrawda is a city in the Damietta Governorate, Egypt. Its population was estimated at about 29,600 people in 2018.

References 

Populated places in Damietta Governorate